Yacouba Diarra (born November 30, 1988 in Bamako) is a Malian football player who currently plays for Tunisian side CS Hammam-Lif.

Career
Diarra began his career in his hometown Bamako with AS Korofina and signed in January 2008 for Tunisian top club ES Sahel, after that he moved in January 2012 to another popular Egyptian club Al-Masry.

International career
Diarra is part of the Mali national football team and made his debut in early 2009.

References

1988 births
Living people
Malian footballers
Étoile Sportive du Sahel players
ES Zarzis players
Mali international footballers
Sportspeople from Bamako
AS Korofina players
ENPPI SC players
Muaither SC players
CS Hammam-Lif players
Qatari Second Division players
Expatriate footballers in Tunisia
Expatriate footballers in Egypt
Expatriate footballers in Qatar
Malian expatriate sportspeople in Tunisia
Malian expatriate sportspeople in Egypt
Malian expatriate sportspeople in Qatar
Association football midfielders
21st-century Malian people